Carlo Antonio Fornasini (1802/18051865) was an Italian ivory trader and amateur field naturalist who worked in Mozambique. He collected numerous specimens of animals, insects and plants, and presented them to the Academy of Sciences of the Institute of Bologna in his home city for scientific study. He is remembered for having had several taxa named in his honour during his lifetime.

Biography
Little seems to be known of his life or background. The honorific cavaliere (roughly equivalent to the British 'Sir'; in the Latin-language sources which mention him, eques) suggests that he himself or his family had some civil distinction. He was from Bologna. Either, he travelled to Pernambuco in Brazil, and, on returning by way of Lisbon and Genoa to Bologna, was encouraged by Professor Antonio Bertoloni and by Count Camilla Salina to pursue in Africa his interest in natural history, and travelled to Mozambique; or, the House of Salina took a paternal interest in him, he left Bologna for Lisbon to pursue a career in commerce, and from there he went to Mozambique. He was a trader in ivory. In a letter dated 1843, he said that he had first visited Mozambique twelve years earlier. He was active as a naturalist in the Inhambane area of Mozambique from 1839  or from 1842. He presented the many natural history specimens he collected during his time in Africa to the Academy of Sciences of the Institute of Bologna, where they were studied by Antonio Bertoloni (1775-1869, physician and botanist), his son Giuseppe Bertoloni (1804-1874, botanist and entomologist), and Giovanni Giuseppe Bianconi (1809-1878, zoologist, herpetologist, botanist and geologist), all professors at the University of Bologna, all full of praise for his labours. Antonio Alessandrini, another professor at the university, called him 'courageous'. He was last mentioned in the scientific annals of Bologna in 1866.

He does not seem to have written any scientific papers. He is not named as author in any of the journals published by the Academy of Sciences between 1834 and 1866.

Taxa named in honour
These are (in date order of the epithet fornasini and suchlike):
Anthia fornasinii G.Bertoloni 1845, a ground beetle
Thornback cowfish, Lactoria fornasini Bianconi 1846 (as Ostracion fornasini), a marine fish
Fornasini's blind snake, Afrotyphlops fornasinii Bianconi 1849 (as Typhlops fornasinii)
 Fornasini's spiny reed frog, Afrixalus fornasini Bianconi 1849 (as Euchnemis fornasini)
Fornasinia Bertol. 1849, a genus of legume in family Leguminosae
 Fornasinia ebenifera Bertol. 1849 (type species), a species in genus Fornasinia 
  Bianconi 1851 (as Menippe fornasinii), a crab in genus  in family Menippidae
  G.Bertoloni 1853, a genus of scarab beetle in subfamily Cetoniinae
  G.Bertoloni 1853 (as Goliathus fornasini; type species), a species in genus Fornasinius
Fulvia fragilis Forsskål in Niebuhr 1775, Cardium fornasinianum Bianconi 1856, a cockle (a shellfish) in genus Fulvia
Eleotris fusca Forster 1801, Eleotris fornasini Bianconi 1856, a freshwater and estuarine fish 
Harlequin quail, Coturnix delegorguei Delegorgue 1847, Coturnix fornasini Bianconi 1865, a bird

Notes

References

Year of birth uncertain
1800s births
Scientists from Bologna
1865 deaths
Date of death unknown
Place of death unknown
19th-century Italian botanists
19th-century Italian zoologists
Businesspeople from Bologna
19th-century Italian businesspeople